Aleksandr Ivanovich Maleyev (born 7 July 1947) is a retired Soviet artistic gymnast. He competed at the 1972 Summer Olympics in all artistic gymnastics events and won a silver medal in the team allround competition. Individually, his best achievement was 14th place on the floor.

Maleyev was born in Voronezh, Russia, but since 1970 lives in Minsk, Belarus. He won a national title in 1971.

References

1947 births
Living people
Gymnasts at the 1972 Summer Olympics
Olympic gymnasts of the Soviet Union
Olympic silver medalists for the Soviet Union
Olympic medalists in gymnastics
Soviet male artistic gymnasts
Medalists at the 1972 Summer Olympics
Sportspeople from Voronezh